The Royal Willingdon Sports Club is a private sports club in South Mumbai.  The club was founded in 1918 by Lord Willingdon, at that time Governor of Bombay. Amenities include an 18-hole golf course, six tennis courts, squash and badminton courts, health club and a swimming pool. Non-sports amenities include a formal dining room, a semi-formal dining room, bar, garden cafe, bakery, members' provision and separate beer and wine shop, a swimming pool cafe and a plant nursery.

Due to overwhelming demand membership has been closed since 1985 and only the children of current members, on a selective basis, can become members. 

Almost all members belong to wealthy, old money families. The club is very selective in granting membership to current members' children and the applicant’s family background takes top priority along with their profession. The crème de la crème of Bombay society considers Willingdon the most prestigious club in the nation.

The Club was one of the first to admit indigenous Indians before Partition.

Willingdon, along with the Breach Candy Club and Bombay Gymkhana, makes up the “Top Three” (a name coined for the top three private clubs of the city of Mumbai).

History
The Royal Willingdon Sports Club (WSC) was founded in 1918 by Lord Willingdon, the then Governor of Bombay. Willingdon was refused permission to take an Indian Maharaja with him to the Bombay Gymkhana, Byculla Club and Royal Bombay Yacht Club, which then allowed only Europeans and hence, decided to start a club that both Indians and Europeans could go to.

Permanent membership is closed except for members' children though temporary corporate memberships are open but mostly taken by expatriates. In the 1980s membership was temporarily opened but then later closed due to overwhelming demand. In 2007, membership was opened to members' daughters as well, much to the consternation of some members, though a majority of Balloting and Disciplinary Committee members saw it fit to admit them as "younger people spend more money." Membership applications for "ordinary members" (members' sons), corporate members and "services" (civil servants and armed forces) are decided by the Balloting and Disciplinary Committee. Indian newspaper Mid-Day wrote that the WSC has an unspoken rule that does not allow film actors and racing professionals, including jockeys, trainers and their spouses to be individuals as "actors might create a nuisance, with their followers lingering around, and ruin the ambience and peace at the club... What is important is not the profession, but the applicant's background. If the jockey is a syce's son who cannot speak seven words of English, he may be rejected." However, Akshay Khanna and his brother Rahul are members from 2010 onwards.

In the 21st century, there was controversy and infighting over the destruction of the badminton courts and the club election process. After the original bar was burned in a fire, the former bakery was turned into the "Pub" that functions as a mini-nightclub on weekends and "Bar Nite" once a month. The former bar is a formal, outside-catered restaurant called the "Golf View Bar" right next to the library on the upper level.

Amenities
The club has an 18-hole golf course (the only private one within the city, the other being the military-only club and another in the suburbs), six tennis courts, ⁣ squash and badminton courts, a health club and a swimming pool. Non-sports amenities include a formal dining room, a semiformal dining room, a bar, a garden café (where children under 21 are allowed), a swimming pool café, a bakery, a plant nursery a members' provision and separate beer and wine shop are available to members at rates cheaper than outside stores as the club is not-for-profit and a mini-grocery store. There is also a pavilion and a patio, as well as facilities to cater for the hosting of members' parties.

Events
A banquet was held at the WSC in 1954 to celebrate the first Filmfare awards ceremony. The event was attended by actor Gregory Peck. One of the award winners, Bimal Roy was not allowed entry into the club for the party as he was dressed in a dhoti.

See also 
 List of India's gentlemen's clubs

References

1933 establishments in India
Sports clubs in Mumbai
Sports organizations established in 1933